Martin Tajmar is a physicist and professor for Space Systems at the Dresden University of Technology. He has research interests in advanced space propulsion systems, FEEP thrusters, breakthrough propulsion physics and possible connections between gravity and superconductivity.

Biography 

Tajmar completed his PhD in numerical plasmaphysics at the Vienna University of Technology, Austria, in 1999, and is now an external lecturer for the university. He also published the textbook Advanced Space Propulsion Systems in 2003.

Gravitomagnetism research 

In a 2003 paper, Tajmar proposed that a gravitational effect may explain the long-standing discrepancy between the mass of Cooper pairs first measured in superconductors by Janet Tate et al. and the theoretically-expected value.

In 2006 Tajmar and several coworkers announced their claim to have measured a gravitomagnetic version of the frame-dragging effect caused by a superconductor with an accelerating or decelerating spin. As of April 2008, the effect has not yet been observed independently.

In February 2008 Tajmar filed an international patent application for a "Process for the generation of a gravitational field and a gravitational field generator."

In June 2008, Tajmar reported a new phenomenon suggesting that signals could be induced in a gyroscope resulting from a new property of rotating low-temperature helium. He also reported that because the rings in the experiment were accelerated pneumatically, and not with high acceleration, the earlier reported results could not be discounted. His further research suggests the anomaly may indeed be coming from liquid helium in the setup.

Awards 
 2001: ARC-Award of the Austrian Research Centers, first prize in the category Science
 2001 and 2000: “Window on Science” Award of the US Air Force
 1999: Promotion through the program „International Communication“ of the Austrian Research Promotion Agency

References

External links 
 Coupling of Electromagnetism and Gravitation in the Weak Field Approximation: 
 3 Mar 2000, arxiv.org: Coupling of Gravitation and Electromagnetism in the Weak Field Approximation, M. Tajmar, C. de Matos
 Towards a new test of general relativity?, (Tajmar gravimagnetic field experiment) European Space Agency News, 2006-03-23
 Measurement of Gravitomagnetic and Acceleration Fields Around Rotating Superconductors 
Gravity's secret, New Scientist, 2006-11-11

Austrian physicists
Anti-gravity
Year of birth missing (living people)
Living people
TU Wien alumni
Academic staff of TU Wien